The Yakima Regional Hospital Challenger was a tournament for professional female tennis players played on outdoor hard courts. The event was classified as a $50,000 ITF Women's Circuit tournament and was held in Yakima, Washington, United States, in 2012 and 2013. The 2014 event was cancelled due to a fire in May and the tournament was moved to Carson, California (the USTA Player Development Classic).

Past finals

Singles

Doubles

References

External links 
 
 ITF search

ITF Women's World Tennis Tour
Hard court tennis tournaments in the United States
Tennis in Washington (state)
Recurring sporting events established in 2012
Recurring sporting events disestablished in 2013